Thapelo Mogale is a South African politician from Economic Freedom Fighters and member of the National Assembly of South Africa since 17 August 2022.

References

See also 

Living people
Members of the National Assembly of South Africa
21st-century South African politicians
Economic Freedom Fighters politicians
Place of birth missing (living people)
Year of birth missing (living people)